Robert Scott Van Duyne (born May 15, 1952) is a former professional American football player who played guard for seven seasons for the Baltimore Colts.

References

1952 births
Living people
Sportspeople from San Bernardino, California
Players of American football from California
American football offensive guards
American football offensive tackles
Highline High School alumni
Idaho Vandals football players
Baltimore Colts players
Hamilton Tiger-Cats players
BC Lions players
Tampa Bay Bandits players